San Francesco D'Assisi is a Roman Catholic church and former minorite convent in the town of Butera, the province of Caltanissetta, the region of Sicily, Italy.

At this site by the 12th-century, there had been a church, Santa Maria del Castello, affiliated with a Cistercian monastery. In 1577, a Franciscan convent was built adjacent under the guidance of the Maestro Lo Monaco and patronized by Francesco Di Paola from Gelese.

The church contains a wooden cross, dated 1631, with an image of Christ putatively painted by Domenichino. The altarpieces depicting the Assumption of the Virgin Mary and of an Immaculate Conception with St Francis are attributed to Filippo Paladino. The altarpieces of  St Michael Archangel, St Francis of Assisi, and Sant'Antonio of Padua were painted by Rocco Di Martino.

A celebration in honor of the Immaculate Conception is held with a bonfire on 8 December.

References

Churches in the province of Caltanissetta
16th-century Roman Catholic church buildings in Italy